The 2020 European Le Mans Series was the seventeenth season of the Automobile Club de l'Ouest's (ACO) European Le Mans Series. The six-event season began at Circuit Paul Ricard on 19 July and finished at Algarve International Circuit on 1 November.

The series was open to Le Mans Prototypes, divided into the LMP2 and LMP3 classes, and grand tourer-style racing cars in the LMGTE class.

Calendar
The revised calendar for the 2020 season was announced on 3 April 2020. Due to the COVID-19 pandemic, the season was shortened and the 4 Hours of Silverstone was removed from the calendar as a date could not be found. Following an increase in COVID-19 cases in Spain, the Barcelona round was replaced by a second race at Paul Ricard.

Entries

LMP2
In accordance with the 2017 LMP2 regulations, all cars in the LMP2 class used the Gibson GK428 V8 engine.

LMP3
All cars in the LMP3 class used the Nissan VK56DE 5.6L V8 engine and Michelin tyres.

LMGTE
All cars in the LMGTE class used Goodyear tyres.

Results
Bold indicates overall winner.

Teams Championships
Points are awarded according to the following structure:

LMP2 Teams Championship

LMP3 Teams Championship

LMGTE Teams Championship

Notes
The two teams from cars #77 and #74 were tied on 99 points at the end of the championship and they both had two wins, two second places, one fourth and two pole positions from the five races. The crew of the #77 Proton Competition Porsche – Christian Ried, Michele Beretta and Alessio Picariello - were declared champions due to the fact they had won the first race of the season at Paul Ricard.

Drivers Championships
Points are awarded according to the following structure:

LMP2 Drivers Championship

LMP3 Drivers Championship

LMGTE Drivers Championship

References

External links
 

European Le Mans Series seasons
European Le Mans Series
Le Mans Series
European Le Mans